Roldán is both a surname and a given name. Notable people with the name include:

People with the surname
 Alex Roldan (born 1996), Salvadoran-American football (soccer) player
 Amadeo Roldán (1900–1939), Cuban composer
 Antonio Roldán (born 1946), Mexican boxer
 Camila Bordonaba Roldán (born 1984), Argentine actress
 Cristian Roldan (born 1995), American football (soccer) player
 Jorge Roldán (born 1940), Guatemalan football coach and former midfielder
 Jorge Pina Roldán (born 1983), Spanish football (soccer) player
 Juan Roldán (born 1957), Argentine boxer
 Kevin Roldán (born 1993), Colombian reggaeton singer
 Luis Roldán (born 1943), Spanish politician
 Luisa Roldán (1652–1706), Spanish sculptor
 Weimar Roldán (born 1985), Colombian road cyclist

People with the given name
 Roldán Rodríguez (born 1984), Spanish racing driver
 Roldán el Temerario, name of the comic strip character Flash Gordon in Hispanoamerica

See also
 Pérez-Roldán
 Roldan v. Los Angeles County, Supreme Court of California case regarding legality of marriage between Filipinos and whites

Masculine given names